CVRD may refer to:

 Vale (mining company), formerly Companhia Vale do Rio Doce
 Comox Valley Regional District, a regional government in British Columbia, Canada
 Cowichan Valley Regional District, a regional government in British Columbia, Canada